Pilar Muñoz Ruiz (March 18, 1911 - October 1, 1980) was a Spanish stage and film actress.

Daughter of actor Alfonso Muñoz and sister of actress Mimí Muñoz, she began acting with Margarita Xirgu in 1925. In 1927 she appeared in La princesa Bebé and 1931 in Vidas cruzadas, both with Jacinto Benavente and next to Xirgú and her father. Three years later came one of their biggest hits, Ni al amor ni al mar, del mismo autor, in 1934 at the Festival de Mérida with Medea and Electra. Premiering soon after was Yerma (1934) - in which she played María.

During the Spanish Civil War, Xirgú accompanied her on a tour of the Americas, premiering in Buenos Aires with La casa de Bernarda Alba. She did not return to Spain until 1947.  In 1950 she starred in En la ardiente oscuridad, alongside José María Rodero and Adolfo Marsillach, under director Luis Escobar. She also appeared in José Martín Recuerda's plays Cena de Navidad (1951) La otra orilla (1954), and El teatrito de don Ramón (1959). In 1969 she starred in Seán O'Casey's play Red Roses for Me, and Ricardo López Aranda's play Isabelita the Miracielos in 1978.

Filmography 

  1979 Los bingueros
  1978 Soldados
  1978 Nunca en horas de clase
  1978 Cabo de vara
  1977 El puente
  1977 Climax
  1976 Emilia... parada y fonda
  1976 Manuela
  1976 La espuela
  1975 Jo, papá
  1974 El amor del capitán Brando
  1969 Juicio de faldas
  1964 El señor de La Salle
  1963 Benigno, hermano mío
  1960 Maribel y la extraña familia
 Back to the Door (1959)
  1954 Malvaloca
 Malibran's Song (1951)
  1950 Sangre en Castilla
 Agustina of Aragon (1950)
  1950 La honradez de la cerradura
  1950 Gente sin importancia
  1950 Crimen en el entreacto
  1945 Villa rica del Espíritu Santo
  1937 Gli ultimi giorni di Pompeo
  1936 El cura de aldea
 Juan Simón's Daughter (1935)
  1935 Nobleza baturra

References

Spanish film actresses
Spanish stage actresses
1911 births
1980 deaths
20th-century Spanish actresses